The 2021–22 UMass Minutewomen basketball team represented the University of Massachusetts Amherst  during the 2021–22 college basketball season. The Minutewomen, led by sixth-year head coach Tory Verdi, were members of the Atlantic 10 Conference and played their home games at the Mullins Center. 

They finished the season 26–7 overall, and 11–4 in A-10 play to finish in third place. As the third seed in the A-10 Tournament they received a bye into the Quarterfinals where they defeated Fordham.  They went on to defeat Saint Joseph's in the Semifinals and first seed Dayton in the Final to win the tournament.   As a result, the Minutewomen received the conference's automatic bid to the NCAA tournament where they were the twelfth seed in the Bridgeport Region.  They lost in the first round to Notre Dame to end their season.

Previous Season 

The Minutewomen finished the season 16–8 overall, and 7–5 in A-10 play to finish in seventh place. As the seventh seed in the A-10 Tournament they received a bye into the Second Round where they defeated Saint Joseph's in overtime.  They would go on to lose to Fordham in the Quarterfinals.  They received an at-large bid to the WNIT.  In the Charlotte regional, they lost in the First Round to Villanova, but won both consolation games versus Charlotte and Ohio.

Roster

Schedule
Source:

|-
!colspan=6 style=| Exhibition

|-
!colspan=6 style=| Non-Conference Regular season

|-
!colspan=6 style=| A-10 Regular season

|-
!colspan=6 style=| Atlantic 10 Tournament

|-
!colspan=6 style=| NCAA tournament

Rankings

The Coaches Poll did not release a Week 2 poll and the AP Poll did not release a poll after the NCAA Tournament.

References

UMass Minutewomen basketball seasons
UMass
UMass Minutewomen basketball
UMass Minutewomen basketball
UMass